Música P/ Acampamentos is a double live compilation by Brazilian rock band Legião Urbana. Released in 1992, it consists of previously unreleased live recordings by the band and one previously unreleased studio song: "A Canção do Senhor da Guerra".

Background and curation 
The band had always been reluctant about releasing a compilation, which culminated in the members' feud with label EMI-Odeon when it tried to edit a compilation without talking to them first.

The album would only come out their way, and ended up being produced in a rather timely occasion, since the previous studio album V tour had been prematurely aborted and the members looked for ways to earn money while vocalist, acoustic guitarist and keyboardist Renato Russo searched for help to get rid of drugs. Meanwhile, they wanted to offer something truly new and not so purely commercial to fans, in order to compensate for the cancellation of so many shows, and that's when they decided to gather live recordings, almost all of which were previously unreleased.

The songs were recorded during lives performances at Parque Antártica Stadium, in São Paulo, in August 1990; in Morro da Urca, Rio de Janeiro, in August 1986; some sessions at radio stations Transamérica FM (Rio de Janeiro), in 1988 and 1992 and Rádio Cidade (Rio de Janeiro), in 1992; and the band's MTV Unplugged album, in 1992. The booklet says all tracks (except "A Canção do Senhor da Guerra" and "Mais do Mesmo") were recorded in only one take and that the original tapes were not enhanced, except for edits, mixes and sound filtering.

The art project was done by Fernanda Villa-Lobos and Gualter Pupo, and the album cover was drawn by drummer Marcelo Bonfá. It was mixed in November 1992. Former bassist Renato Rocha and touring musicians are also featured. Russo and guitarist Dado Villa-Lobos agreed that the album summed up the history of the band appropriately, since it covered all lineups.

"A Canção do Senhor da Guerra" 
The only studio track of the album is "A Canção do Senhor da Guerra" (The Song of the Lord of War). Originally, it was simply titled "O Senhor da Guerra" (The Lord of War) and was featured in an album from A Era dos Halley, a Rede Globo children special aired from November 1985 to May 1986. The band guest starred in one of the episodes, performing the song to the characters and wearing medieval clothes. The album was produced by Guto Graça Mello and featured performances by Tim Maia, Roupa Nova, Baby Consuelo, Sempre Livre, Rosana and Guilherme Lamounier, Titãs, Sérgio Dias, Txã and Gabriela.

This album's version is different, not only in the title, but also in the fact that it was entirely recorded by Russo, who played all instruments over an electronic drum set.

A rare interview with Raul Seixas that circulates on the Internet suggests that the song had originally been requested to him. He says he had just created a new song with Lena Coutinho and that he would take it to Rio de Janeiro the following day. "I will be the 'Lord of War'", he said. It's not known why Legião Urbana's version was ultimately chosen over his.

Track listing

Disc 1

Disc 2

Personnel 
 Renato Russo — lead vocals, acoustic guitar
 Dado Villa-Lobos — guitar
 Marcelo Bonfá — drums
 Renato Rocha — bass guitar on "Ainda É Cedo" and "Baader-Meinhof Blues"

Touring musicians (in São Paulo)
 Fred Nascimento — acoustic guitar
 Bruno Araújo — bass guitar
 Mú Carvalho — keyboards

Músicos convidados (in Rio de Janeiro)
 Sérgio Serra — acoustic and electric guitar
 Tavinho Fialho — bass guitar
 Carlos Trilha — keyboards

References

 

1992 compilation albums
Legião Urbana albums
EMI Records compilation albums